Morgan Welles Brown (January 1, 1800 – March 7, 1853) was a United States district judge of the United States District Court for the Eastern District of Tennessee, the United States District Court for the Middle District of Tennessee and the United States District Court for the Western District of Tennessee.

Education and career

Born in 1800, in Clarksville, Tennessee, Brown read law , in the offices of his brother, William Little Brown, who served as Solicitor General of Tennessee (1814–1822) and as Justice of the Supreme Court of Appeals and Errors (1822 to 1824). He entered private practice in Nashville, Tennessee until 1833. He was editor of the Nashville Republican from 1832 to 1833.

Contemporary description

Brown was described as a man "of considerable reading and literary tastes, a fine miscellaneous writer . . . and a gentleman of polished manners and high social qualities."

Federal judicial service

Brown was nominated by President Andrew Jackson on December 18, 1833, to a joint seat on the United States District Court for the Eastern District of Tennessee and the United States District Court for the Western District of Tennessee vacated by Judge John McNairy. He was confirmed by the United States Senate on December 31, 1833, and received his commission on January 3, 1834. Brown was assigned by operation of law to additional and concurrent service on the United States District Court for the Middle District of Tennessee on June 18, 1839, to a new seat authorized by 5 Stat. 313. His service terminated on March 7, 1853, due to his death in Nashville. He was interred in Mount Olivet Cemetery in Nashville.

Controversy regarding his appointment

In nominating Brown, President Jackson ignored the recommendations of the Tennessee Democratic legislative delegation who found Brown unacceptable because "he had edited an anti-Jackson newspaper during the Nullification Crisis." Instead Jackson was influenced by Brown's brother, Justice William Little Brown, as well as State Supreme Court Justice and later United States Supreme Court Justice John Catron and pushed through Brown's appointment.

Other service

Concurrent with his federal judicial service, Brown served as commissioner to oversee erection of the state capitol in Nashville from 1843 to 1844.

Family

Brown was the son of Morgan Brown, who studied medicine and was called "Dr. Brown" although he seems never to have practiced medicine. His mother was the former Elizabeth Little. His parents were originally from Grassy Island on the Pee Dee River in Anson County, North Carolina. In 1795, they migrated to Tennessee and settled near the Cumberland River where Dr. Brown founded the town of Palmyra, a former community in Montgomery County, which was made a port of entry, the only one at the time west of the Allegheny Mountains. On November 10, 1826, Brown married Ann Maria Childress of Nashville and they had three children.

References

Sources
 
 

1800 births
1853 deaths
People from Clarksville, Tennessee
Judges of the United States District Court for the Western District of Tennessee
Judges of the United States District Court for the Eastern District of Tennessee
Judges of the United States District Court for the Middle District of Tennessee
United States federal judges appointed by Andrew Jackson
19th-century American judges
United States federal judges admitted to the practice of law by reading law